The Ghost You Gave to Me is the sixth full-length album by progressive rock band, 3, released by Metal Blade Records on October 11, 2011.

Track listing
"Sirenum Scopuli" - 1:11
"React" - 4:11
"Sparrow" - 4:04
"High Times" - 4:37
"Numbers" - 4:39
"One with the Sun" - 6:09
"The Ghost You Gave to Me" - 3:56
"Pretty" - 4:51
"Afterglow" - 4:11
"It's Alive" - 3:51
"Only Child" - 7:18
"The Barrier" - 5:27

Personnel
Joey Eppard - guitars, vocals
Billy Riker - guitars
Chris Gartmann - percussion
Daniel Grimsland - bass guitar

References

3 (American band) albums
2011 albums